Nice-Riquier is a train station on the line from Marseille to Ventimiglia, situated in Nice, in the department of Alpes-Maritimes in the region of Provence-Alpes-Côte d'Azur, France. As of 2022, the station is served by regional trains (TER Provence-Alpes-Côte d'Azur) to Cannes, Grasse, Ventimiglia and Nice.

References

External links

Transport in Nice
Buildings and structures in Nice
Railway stations in Alpes-Maritimes
TER Provence-Alpes-Côte-d'Azur
Railway stations in France opened in 1868